State and Ancientry is the second album by folk duo Hannah James and Sam Sweeney.

Track listing

Personnel

Hannah James (piano accordion, vocals, clogs)
Sam Sweeney (fiddle, viola, nyckelharpa, English Bagpipes, Hardanger Fiddle)

2012 albums
Hannah James and Sam Sweeney albums